Gento may refer to:

 Gento (son of Genseric) (died 477), the fourth and youngest son of Genseric, the founder of the Vandal kingdom in Africa
 Gento (Goth), 5th century Gothic soldier in Eastern Roman service
 Francisco Gento (1933–2022), also known as Gento I, a Spanish footballer
 Julio Gento (1939–2016), also known as Gento II, a Spanish footballer
 Antonio Gento (1940–2020), also known as Gento III, a Spanish footballer
 Francisco Llorente Gento (born 1965), Spanish footballer
 Gentō, Japanese name for magic lanterns

See also 
 Gentoo Linux, a computer operating system based on the Linux kernel